In geometry, a decagon (from the Greek δέκα déka and γωνία gonía, "ten angles") is a ten-sided polygon or 10-gon. The total sum of the interior angles of a simple decagon is 1440°.

Regular decagon
A regular decagon has all sides of equal length and each internal angle will always be equal to 144°. Its Schläfli symbol is {10}  and can also be constructed as a truncated pentagon, t{5}, a quasiregular decagon alternating two types of edges.

Side length 

The picture shows a regular decagon with side length  and radius  of the circumscribed circle.

 The triangle  has to equally long legs with length  and a base with length 
 Now the triangle  is a isosceles triangle with vertex  and with base angles .
 Therefore . So  and hence  is also a isosceles triangle with vertex .
 The isosceles triangles  and  have equal angles of 36° at the vertex, and so they're similar, hence: 
 Multiplication with the denominators  leads to the quadratic equation: 
 This equation for the side length  has one positive solution: 
So the regular decagon can be constructed with ruler and compass.

Further conclusions

Area
The area of a regular decagon of side length a is given by:

In terms of the apothem r (see also inscribed figure), the area is:

In terms of the circumradius R, the area is:

An alternative formula is  where d is the distance between parallel sides, or the height when the decagon stands on one side as base, or the diameter of the decagon's inscribed circle.
By simple trigonometry,

and it can be written algebraically as

Sides
A regular decagon has 10 sides and is equilateral. It has 35 diagonals

Construction
As 10 = 2 × 5, a power of two times a Fermat prime, it follows that a regular decagon is constructible using compass and straightedge, or by an edge-bisection of a regular pentagon.

An alternative (but similar) method is as follows:
Construct a pentagon in a circle by one of the methods shown in constructing a pentagon.
Extend a line from each vertex of the pentagon through the center of the circle to the opposite side of that same circle. Where each line cuts the circle is a vertex of the decagon.  In other words,  the image of a regular pentagon under a point reflection with respect of its center is a concentric congruent pentagon,  and the two pentagons have in total the vertices of a concentric regular decagon.
The five corners of the pentagon constitute alternate corners of the decagon. Join these points to the adjacent new points to form the decagon.

Nonconvex regular decagon

So we can get the properties of a regular decagonal star, through a tiling by golden triangles that fills this star polygon.

The golden ratio in decagon 
Both in the construction with given circumcircle as well as with given side length is the golden ratio dividing a line segment by exterior division the
determining construction element.

 In the construction with given circumcircle the circular arc around G with radius  produces the segment , whose division corresponds to the golden ratio.

 In the construction with given side length the circular arc around D with radius  produces the segment , whose division corresponds to the golden ratio.

Symmetry

The regular decagon has Dih10 symmetry, order 20. There are 3 subgroup dihedral symmetries: Dih5, Dih2, and Dih1, and 4 cyclic group symmetries: Z10, Z5, Z2, and Z1.

These 8 symmetries can be seen in 10 distinct symmetries on the decagon, a larger number because the lines of reflections can either pass through vertices or edges. John Conway labels these by a letter and group order. Full symmetry of the regular form is r20 and no symmetry is labeled a1. The dihedral symmetries are divided depending on whether they pass through vertices (d for diagonal) or edges (p for perpendiculars), and i when reflection lines path through both edges and vertices. Cyclic symmetries in the middle column are labeled as g for their central gyration orders.

Each subgroup symmetry allows one or more degrees of freedom for irregular forms. Only the g10 subgroup has no degrees of freedom but can seen as directed edges.

The highest symmetry irregular decagons are d10, an isogonal decagon constructed by five mirrors which can alternate long and short edges, and p10, an isotoxal decagon, constructed with equal edge lengths, but vertices alternating two different internal angles. These two forms are duals of each other and have half the symmetry order of the regular decagon.

Dissection

Coxeter states that every zonogon (a 2m-gon whose opposite sides are parallel and of equal length) can be dissected into m(m-1)/2 parallelograms.
In particular this is true for regular polygons with evenly many sides, in which case the parallelograms are all rhombi. For the regular decagon, m=5, and it can be divided into 10 rhombs, with examples shown below. This decomposition can be seen as 10 of 80 faces in a Petrie polygon projection plane of the 5-cube. A dissection is based on 10 of 30 faces of the rhombic triacontahedron. The list  defines the number of solutions as 62, with 2 orientations for the first symmetric form, and 10 orientations for the other 6.

Skew decagon

A skew decagon is a skew polygon with 10 vertices and edges but not existing on the same plane. The interior of such an decagon is not generally defined. A skew zig-zag decagon has vertices alternating between two parallel planes.

A regular skew decagon is vertex-transitive with equal edge lengths. In 3-dimensions it will be a zig-zag skew decagon and can be seen in the vertices and side edges of a pentagonal antiprism, pentagrammic antiprism, and pentagrammic crossed-antiprism with the same D5d, [2+,10] symmetry, order 20.

These can also be seen in these 4 convex polyhedra with icosahedral symmetry. The polygons on the perimeter of these projections are regular skew decagons.

Petrie polygons
The regular skew decagon is the Petrie polygon for many higher-dimensional polytopes, shown in these orthogonal projections in various Coxeter planes: The number of sides in the Petrie polygon is equal to the Coxeter number, h, for each symmetry family.

See also
Decagonal number and centered decagonal number, figurate numbers modeled on the decagon
Decagram, a star polygon with the same vertex positions as the regular decagon

References

External links

Definition and properties of a decagon With interactive animation

10 (number)
Constructible polygons
Polygons by the number of sides
Elementary shapes